704Games Company (formerly known as Dusenberry Martin Racing) is an American video game developer and publisher based in Charlotte, North Carolina. The company acquired the license to be the exclusive developer of NASCAR video games in January 2015 and has since released six console games and a mobile game.

The company has a long-standing relationship with the National Association for Stock Car Auto Racing (NASCAR) and has the exclusive rights to develop and publish video games featuring the NASCAR brand.

History

704Games was formed as Dusenberry Martin Racing in January 2015, a subsidiary of HC2 Holdings; HC2 Holdings acquired the license to develop NASCAR video games from Eutechnyx on January 1, 2015. As a result of the acquisition, DMR received NASCAR '15, a video game that Eutechnyx had been developing. On April 13, 2015, Dusenberry Martin Racing secured $8,000,000 in equity capital.

NASCAR '15 was published and released by DMR on May 22, 2015. The company was also beginning the development of its first video game, NASCAR Heat Evolution while collaborating with Monster Games. The game was officially announced on May 20, 2016, and was released on September 13, 2016. In 2017, NASCAR Heat Mobile was released as a soft launch exclusive to Canada on March 8 and was released in the US on April 24. On March 21, an unnamed sequel to NASCAR Heat Evolution was announced, which was later revealed to be named NASCAR Heat 2 and was released September 12. On July 7, 2018, NASCAR Heat 3 was announced with a release date of September 7, 2018.

In 2017, DMR rebranded to 704Games (taken from Charlotte's area code (704)) and hired former NASCAR Media Group President, NASCAR Senior Vice President, and DMR chairman Paul Brooks as CEO.

In August 2018, it was announced Motorsport Network invested in 704Games. It was later revealed in March 2019 and later, in 2021, Motorsport Network made a majority investment in 704Games. Additionally, Colin Smith, former CEO of Motorsport Network, replaced Ed Martin as President of 704Games while Martin will direct 704Games’ esports initiatives. Paul Brooks will move into a non-executive chairman role. Finally, as part of the Motorsport Network deal, NASCAR extended its video game and esports license with 704Games through 2029. Subsequent NASCAR games published by the company however were developed by Motorsport Games as the listed developer.

Games
NASCAR '15
NASCAR Heat Evolution
NASCAR Heat Mobile
NASCAR Heat 2
NASCAR Heat 3
NASCAR Heat 4
NASCAR Heat 5

References

External links

American companies established in 2015
Video game development companies
Video game companies of the United States
Video game companies established in 2015
Video game publishers
2015 establishments in North Carolina
Companies based in Charlotte, North Carolina
Mobile game companies
NASCAR mass media